Peas Creek is a stream in Boone County, Iowa, in the United States.

Peas Creek was named for John Pea, a pioneer who settled near there.

See also
List of rivers of Iowa

References

Rivers of Boone County, Iowa
Rivers of Iowa